During the 1991–92 English football season, Southampton F.C. competed in the Football League First Division.

Season summary 
In the 1991–92 season, Ian Branfoot took over as Southampton boss but their fortunes fared no better and only managed to secure a 16th-place finish despite reaching the Full Members Cup final at Wembley only to lose 3–2 against Nottingham Forest.

During the summer of 1992, Branfoot became "the most popular manager in English football", as he took telephone calls from clubs "trying to bargain with players they don't want plus cash", conceding that he would be forced to sell 21-year-old top scorer Alan Shearer, following a season of speculation about Shearer's future, with the likes of Liverpool and Manchester United being linked with Shearer's signature in the autumn of 1991. Despite this interest, Shearer decided to stay at Southampton until the end of the season before making a decision about his future.

Although Branfoot eventually accepted that a sale was inevitable, he claimed that "whatever happens, we are in the driving seat". Eventually, Shearer was sold to newly promoted Blackburn Rovers for a national record fee of £3.6 million, with Blackburn's top scorer David Speedie reluctantly moving to The Dell as part of the deal. Despite Branfoot's claim to be "in the driving seat", Saints failed to include a "sell-on clause" in the contract.

Squad

Transfers

In

Out

Loaned Out

Final league table

Results

First Division

League Cup (Rumbelows Cup)

FA Cup

Full Members Cup (Zenith Data Systems Cup)

References

Southampton F.C. seasons
Southampton